Love Through Different Times, also known as Funniest Stories of the Ming's Royalists, is a 2002 Chinese television comedy-drama.

A ludicrous story, the drama uses time travel to explain the mysterious disappearance of Ming dynasty's Jianwen Emperor after the Jingnan Campaign. It stars Taiwanese actress Zhang Ting as a kungfu-trained thief who time-traveled from modern Hong Kong to 14th-century Nanjing, where she fell in love with Zhu Yunwen (Xu Zheng), the eventual Jianwen Emperor.

It is considered the first time-travel television series produced in mainland China.

Cast and characters
Zhang Ting as Xiaowanzi
Xu Zheng as Zhu Yunwen (Jianwen Emperor) 
Wan Hongjie as Zhu Di (Yongle Emperor)
Liu Lili as Zhang Chuchu
Sun Baoguang as Zhu Yuanzhang (Hongwu Emperor)
Hou Jingyu as Zhu Shuang
Gao Yong as Zhu Gang

See also
The Perfect Banquet, a 2004 Chinese comedy drama also starring Zhang Ting and Xu Zheng

References

2002 Chinese television series debuts
2002 Chinese television series endings
Television series set in the Ming dynasty
Mandarin-language television shows
Chinese comedy-drama television series
Chinese time travel television series
Television series set in the 14th century